Ghisalba is a comune (municipality) in the Province of Bergamo in the Italian region of Lombardy, located about  northeast of Milan and about  southeast of Bergamo.

Ghisalba borders the following municipalities: Calcinate, Cavernago, Cologno al Serio, Martinengo, Mornico al Serio, Urgnano.

Demographics

References